Caffè d'orzo (Italian for "coffee of barley", often shortened to simply orzo) or barley coffee is a type of hot drink, originating in Italy. Orzo is a caffeine-free roasted grain beverage made from ground barley (orzo in Italian, from Latin hordeum). It is an espresso-style drink, and when prepared from the roasted barley directly, it can easily be made in typical espresso machines and coffeemakers. In Italy it is widely available in coffee vending machines. Although traditionally considered a coffee substitute for children, it is an increasingly common choice in Italy and other places for those who choose to eschew caffeine for health reasons.

In Italy caffè d'orzo is made in traditional Italian espresso machines in cafes. Italian families tend, instead, to make it using an orziera, a special moka pot adapted to barley. 

During World War II and in post-war times, caffè d'orzo and chicory became the most popular drinks in Europe. They were both used as substitutes for coffee, which was expensive and hard to find. In European countries with a very long post-war period, like for instance Spain, this image of barley as a cheap surrogate of coffee still remains in the memory of the population. Thus, from having dozens of Spanish producers in the 1950s and being a widely popular drink in the Spanish Mediterranean coast, now Spain only has two roasters of barley. In Italy, instead, there are dozens of roasters making caffè d'orzo and it is a very popular drink. Outside of Italy the consumption of caffè d'orzo as a healthy drink is also increasing slowly, especially in Germany.

A variety called  ("coffee of barley") in Spanish and simply  in Portuguese is available in Latin American markets, though it is often more of a roasted barley tea than a coffee-like beverage. Instant roasted barley drinks are sold under various brand names (although most of them are made with a mix of cereals, not only barley) such as Caro (Europe, New Zealand), Pero (Switzerland, US) and Barleycup (UK), among others.

See also
 Postum (similar, but wheat-based)
 List of barley-based beverages

References

Barley-based drinks
Coffee substitutes

it:Bevanda_d'orzo#Caffè d'orzo